Davide Borin (born 8 January 1989 in Turin) is an Italian professional football player currently playing for Lega Pro Seconda Divisione team A.S. Pro Belvedere Vercelli on loan from Juventus F.C.

Career

Juventus
Borin began his footballing career with Serie A giants Juventus FC. He was promoted from the club's youth system in 2008, and was loaned out to A.S. Pro Belvedere Vercelli in July 2008, on a two-season loan deal. In his two seasons with the Lega Pro club, Borin has made 41 total appearances with 1 goal to his credit. He is set to return to Juventus in June 2010.

External links
 

1989 births
Living people
Italian footballers
Juventus F.C. players
Association football defenders